The Apple Certified Desktop Technician (ACDT) was a computer certification that verified the ability of a person to perform basic repairs and troubleshooting on Apple's desktop Macintosh computers. It has been superseded by the Apple Certified Macintosh Technician (or ACMT) certification, which  combines the former desktop and portable qualifications into one.

Footnotes

External links
 Computer Certifications

Apple Inc. services